Diana Laura Coraza Castañeda (born 6 June 1995) is a Mexican blind para athlete who competes in sprinting and middle-distance running events at international elite competitions. She is a World champion and a Parapan American Games bronze medalist.

References

1995 births
Living people
Sportspeople from Tlaxcala
Sportspeople from Puebla
Paralympic athletes of Mexico
Mexican female sprinters
Mexican female middle-distance runners
Athletes (track and field) at the 2016 Summer Paralympics
Athletes (track and field) at the 2020 Summer Paralympics
Medalists at the World Para Athletics Championships
World Para Athletics Championships winners
Medalists at the 2019 Parapan American Games